Lucy Chao or Zhao Luorui (May 9, 1912 – January 1, 1998) was a Chinese poet and translator.

Biography
Chao was born on May 9, 1912 in Xinshi, Deqing County, Zhejiang, China. 

She married Chen Mengjia, an anthropologist and expert on oracle bones, in 1932. In 1944 Chao and Chen were awarded a joint fellowship by the Rockefeller Foundation to study at the University of Chicago in the United States. Chao earned her PhD from the institution in 1948, for a dissertation on Henry James. Afterwards, she returned to China to teach English and North American literature at Yenching University, Beijing.

Chao's husband Chen opposed the government's proposal to simplify Chinese writing in the 1950s and was labeled a Rightist and an enemy of the Communist Party. He was sent to a labor camp in 1957. After he returned, he was banned from publishing research and committed suicide after denunciation and persecution during the Cultural Revolution.

After Chen's death, Chao developed schizophrenia. In spite of this, she created the first complete Chinese translation of Walt Whitman's Leaves of Grass, which was published in 1991. That same year, she was awarded the University of Chicago's "Professional Achievement Award".

Works
Chao translated T. S. Eliot's The Waste Land (1937), Longfellow's The Song of Hiawatha and eventually saw a mass publication of her translation of the whole of Whitman's Leaves of Grass (1991). She was a co-editor of the first Chinese-language History of European Literature (1979).

References

Sources

Further reading
 Price, Kenneth M. 'An Interview with Zhao Luorui.' Walt Whitman Quarterly Review 13 (1995): 59–63. Publ. 1996.
 Bloomsbury Guide to Women's Literature

External links

 Walt Whitman in China

1912 births
1998 deaths
English–Chinese translators
Republic of China poets
People's Republic of China poets
Chinese women poets
Writers from Huzhou
Educators from Huzhou
Yenching University alumni
Tsinghua University alumni
Academic staff of Yenching University
Academic staff of Peking University
University of Chicago alumni
Republic of China translators
People's Republic of China translators
20th-century Chinese women writers
20th-century Chinese translators
20th-century Chinese poets
Poets from Zhejiang
People from Deqing County, Zhejiang